The Municipality of Arran–Elderslie is a township in Bruce County in Western Ontario, Canada. The township is located at the headwaters of the Sauble River, and the Saugeen River forms the northwestern boundary.

Communities

The township comprises the communities of Allenford, Arkwright, Arranvale, Burgoyne, Chesley, Dobbinton, Dreamland, Dunblane, Ellengowan, Elsinore, Gillies Hill, Invermay, Kelly's Corners, Lockerby, Mount Hope, Paisley, Salem, Salisbury, Tara, Vesta and Williscroft.

Demographics 

Population trend:
 Population in 2016: 6,803
 Population in 2011: 6,810
 Population in 2006: 6,747
 Population in 2001: 6,577
 Population total in 1996: 6,851
 Arran (township): 1,707
 Chesley (town): 1,904
 Elderslie (township): 1,231
 Paisley (village): 1,106
 Tara (village): 903
 Population in 1991:
 Arran (township): 1,690
 Chesley (town): 1,852
 Elderslie (township): 1,219
 Paisley (village): 1,102
 Tara (village): 848

See also
 List of municipalities in Ontario
Bruce County municipal elections, 2010
List of townships in Ontario

References

External links

Lower-tier municipalities in Ontario
Municipalities in Bruce County